The Transsexual Empire: The Making of the She-Male is a 1979 book critical of transgender people by American radical feminist author and activist Janice Raymond. The book is derived from Raymond's dissertation, which was produced under the supervision of the feminist theologian Mary Daly.

Summary

Raymond investigates the role of transgender people in society—particularly psychological and surgical approaches to it—and argues that the notion of trans people reinforce traditional gender stereotypes. Raymond also writes about the ways in which the medical-psychiatric complex is medicalizing gender identity and the social and political context that has helped spawn gender-affirming treatment and surgery as normal and therapeutic medicine.

Raymond maintains that the notion of transgender people is based on the "patriarchal myths" of "male mothering" and "making of woman according to man's image". She claims this is done in order "to colonize feminist identification, culture, politics and sexuality", adding, "All transsexuals rape women's bodies by reducing the real female form to an artifact, appropriating this body for themselves... Transsexuals merely cut off the most obvious means of invading women, so that they seem non-invasive."

Publication history
In 1979, the first edition of The Transsexual Empire was published by Beacon Press, a nonprofit publisher in Boston run by the Unitarian Universalist Association. In 1980, the book was published in the United Kingdom by The Women's Press. In 1994, a second edition was published by Teachers College Press.

Reception
At the time of publishing, The Transsexual Empire was respected and admired in mainstream media, with psychiatrist Thomas Szasz commenting that "[it] has rightly seized on transsexualism as an emblem of modern society's unremitting—though increasingly concealed—antifeminism." In a 1980 review, the philosopher Sarah Hoagland called it a "fecund discussion of patriarchal deception". However, that interpretation has since gone out of vogue.

Raymond's views on trans people have been criticized by many in the LGBT and feminist communities as extremely transphobic, and constituting hate speech against trans men and trans women.

In The Transsexual Empire, Raymond included sections on Sandy Stone, a trans woman who had worked as a sound engineer for Olivia Records, and Christy Barsky, accusing both of creating divisiveness in women's spaces. These writings have been heavily criticized as personal attacks on these individuals. In 1987, Stone wrote "The Empire Strikes Back: A Posttranssexual Manifesto", a foundational text of transgender studies, in response to The Transsexual Empire.

Carol Riddell argues that The Transsexual Empire "did not invent anti-transsexual prejudice, but it did more to justify and perpetuate it than perhaps any other book ever written."

Natalie Washington noted that The Transsexual Empire is "the book, so influential on modern anti-trans movements, in which she suggests 'the problem of transsexualism would best be served by morally mandating it out of existence'"

See also
 Feminist views on transgender topics

References

External links
 Fictions and Facts About the Transsexual Empire – Janice Raymond's comments about her book.
 Complete book on the author's website

1979 non-fiction books
American non-fiction books
Beacon Press books
Debut books
English-language books
Feminism and transgender
LGBT-related controversies in literature
Radical feminist books
Transgender non-fiction books
Trans women
Transphobia